Rudno Landscape Park (Rudniański Park Krajobrazowy) is a protected area (Landscape Park) in southern Poland. The area of the park is 58.139 km², while its buffer zone is 67.13 km². Established in 1981.

The Park lies within Lesser Poland Voivodeship. It takes its name from the village of Rudno.

There are two nature reserves in the park:

 Rudno Potok Valley – a forest and landscape reserve, established in 2001; it includes a fragment of a well-preserved alder forest and geological sites of the former porphyry quarry.
 Kajasówka – an inanimate nature reserve, established in 1962; the unique tectonic framework covered with xerothermic vegetation is protected.

The park is part of the Jurassic Landscape Parks Complex.

References 

Rudno
Parks in Lesser Poland Voivodeship